Juan Cristóbal Tapia de Veer is a Chilean-born Canadian film and television score composer, arranger, producer and multi-instrumentalist based in Montreal, Quebec, Canada. He is best known for his score of the British TV series Utopia, for which he won a Royal Television Society award in the best original score category in 2013, and Channel 4's National Treasure, which earned him a BAFTA in 2017. He has received awards from the Society of Composers, Authors and Music Publishers of Canada in 2013 and 2017.

Early life 
Tapia de Veer was born during the 1973 military coup d'état in Chile. His parents fled to Paris, France. After the coup, his father remained in France, and his mother took him back to Chile. Life under Pinochet's dictatorship still proved difficult, so they became political refugees in Quebec, Canada.

Early career 
Tapia de Veer obtained a master's degree in classical music (specializing in percussion) from the Conservatoire de musique du Québec. In 2001 he signed to Warner Music with his pop band One Ton, putting a hold on his classical career. The trio won the Canadian Dance Music Award (SOCAN) in 2003 with the electro-dance single "Supersex World". Tapia de Veer produced the album.

Film and television scoring 
In 2011, his music for the Victorian four-part drama The Crimson Petal and the White (directed by Marc Munden, BBC2) was well received by critics. Matthew Gilbert of The Boston Globe, said: "The soundtrack ranges from gnawing electronic hums to choral ecstasy. It's all brilliantly, effectively, appropriately jarring".

He went on to compose the music for the Channel 4 conspiracy thriller Utopia (created by Dennis Kelly) for which he won a Royal Television Society Craft & Design Award for "best original music" in November 2013. The judges stated his "work blurred the lines between sound design and score, creating a soundtrack that the jury said felt like it was being played inside your head". Up again for an RTS Award in 2014, the music for the second series won the Music & Sound Award in 2015 in the Best Original TV Score category. His work on Utopia was nominated for Televisual Magazine's Bulldog Award for best music and subsequently released on yellow and green vinyl.

In early 2014, Tapia de Veer completed the music for the TV-show Série noire, which aired on ICI-Radio-Canada Télé. The Academy of Canadian Cinema and Television awarded him with two Prix Gémeaux for best Original Music and Best Musical Theme the same year and again in 2016 for the second season.

He also finished the works on BBC's Jamaica Inn, directed by Phillipa Lowthorpe. Tapia de Veer then wrote the music for the first season of AMC's / Channel 4's co-production Humans.

In 2016, he scored his first feature film, The Girl with All the Gifts, which opened the Locarno Film Festival. His music won in the Best Original Music category at the Festival international du film fantastique de Gérardmer, France, in 2017. Paramount Pictures used his opening theme, GIFTED, for the final trailer of the 2019 remake of Pet Sematary and Focus Home Interactive for their videogame Call of Cthulhu.

Tapia de Veer was unable to score the following season of Humans, because he teamed up with Marc Munden again, to work on National Treasure, Channel 4's four-part drama inspired by Operation Yewtree, the police investigation into the sexual abuse perpetrated by Jimmy Savile and allegations against other media personalities. The series won a BAFTA and a FIPA D'OR at the Festival International de Programmes Audiovisuels in Biarritz, France, for Tapia de Veer's original score.

BBC America's series Dirk Gently's Holistic Detective Agency found a small but dedicated fanbase in 2016, which is still waiting for a soundtrack album to be released. Due to Tapia de Veer's heavily charged schedule, he was not able to work on the second season.

In the same year Amazon Prime offered Tapia de Veer to work on two episodes of the anthology series Philip K. Dick's Electric Dreams. He worked on HUMAN IS, starring Bryan Cranston as well as CRAZY DIAMOND, starring Steve Buscemi, for which he got a nomination for a Primetime Emmy Award the following year.

He also scored the Season 4 episode of Netflix's series Black Mirror entitled "Black Museum".

SOCAN awarded him with the SOCAN International Achievement Award in fall 2017, marking the first time that a composer for film and television has been awarded the prize.

In 2018, the Canneseries festival invited Tapia de Veer to be part of the jury for its first season, alongside Michael Kenneth Williams, German actress Paula Beer, Melisa Sozen, French screenwriter and director Audrey Fouché, and Harlan Coben.

He then scored his second feature film, Advantages of Travelling by Train, a 2019 adaptation of Antonio Orejudo's novel of the same name, directed by Aritz Moreno and produced by Morena Films in Spain, starring Luis Tosar, Pilar Castro, and Javier Botet. The film competed in major film festivals such as Sitges, Tokyo, and Brussels Film Festival (BRFF), and was awarded "Best Comedy" at the Goya Awards in 2020. Tapia de Veer's music for the film earned him a nomination at Spain's Premios Feroz.

Releases in 2020 include the series Hunters for Amazon Prime and the drama The Third Day for HBO/ SKY.

In 2021, he scored the HBO limited series The White Lotus, for which he won two Primetime Emmy Awards (one for the main title music, and the other for his work scoring the series) and a Society of Composers & Lyricists Award. He also received his 2nd BAFTA nomination for his music to The Third Day.

The following year, he scored the supernatural horror film Smile, directed by Parker Finn. He also scored the second season of The White Lotus in collaboration with Kim Neundorf.

Discography

Soundtrack releases

 The White Lotus: Season 2 (WaterTower Music, 2022)
 Smile (Paramount Music, 2022)
 The White Lotus (WaterTower Music, 2021)
 The Third Day: Summer (Milan Records / Sony Music, 2020)
 Philip K. Dick's: Electric Dreams (La La Land Records / 2018)
 Black Mirror: Black Museum (Lakeshore Records, 2018) 
 The Girl with all the Gifts (Mondo, Death Waltz Records, 2017)
 National Treasure (Free Run Artists, 2017)
 Humans (Silva Screen Records, 2015)
 Utopia: Season 2 (Silva Screen Records, 2014)
 Utopia (Silva Screen Records, 2013)

References

External links 

Cristobal Tapia de Veer on SoundCloud

1973 births
Living people
Canadian composers
Canadian male composers
Chilean composers
Chilean male composers
Canadian multi-instrumentalists
Musicians from Santiago
Canadian people of Chilean descent
Chilean multi-instrumentalists
Primetime Emmy Award winners